The 1969 South Dakota Coyotes football team was an American football team that represented the University of South Dakota in the North Central Conference (NCC) during the 1969 NCAA College Division football season. In its fourth season under head coach Joe Salem, the team compiled a 3–7 record (2–4 against NCC opponents), tied for fifth place out of seven teams in the NCC, and was outscored by a total of 228 to 208. The team played its home games at Inman Field in Vermillion, South Dakota.

Schedule

References

South Dakota
South Dakota Coyotes football seasons
South Dakota Coyotes football